São Lourenço is a civil parish of Macau. It is located in the southwestern of Macau Peninsula and named after Lawrence of Rome.

This parish was one of five in the former Municipality of Macau, one of Macau's two municipalities that were abolished on 31 December 2001 by Law No. 17/2001, following the 1999 transfer of sovereignty over Macau from Portugal to China. While their administrative functions have since been removed, these parishes are still retained nominally.

It was surrounded by water on all sides except north and Southeast. It neighbours Freguesia da Sé. The Portuguese governor building and current administrative buildings are located here. The hillsides contain a residential area of luxurious villas.
 Area: 0.9 km² (13.4% of the peninsula)
 Population: 45,600
 Population density: 50,904 persons per km²

Government
 Macau Government Headquarters
 Macau Government House
 Government Printing Bureau headquarters

Tourist attractions
 A-Ma Temple
 Dom Pedro V Theatre
 Leal Senado Building
 Mandarin's House
 Maritime Museum
 Moorish Barracks
 Our Lady of Penha Chapel
 Penha Hill
 Sir Robert Ho Tung Library
 St. Joseph's Seminary and Church

Transportation
 Inner Harbour Ferry Terminal

Healthcare
The Macau government operates the Centro de Saúde de S. Lourenço (風順堂衛生中心) in Fong Son Tong.

Education

All schools in this parish are private and subsidized by the Macau government.
 Escola Estrela do Mar - Preschool through secondary school
 Escola Há Ván Châm Vui (下環浸會學校) - Preschool and primary school
 Escola Santa Maria Mazzarello (聖瑪沙利羅學校) - Preschool and primary school
 Instituto Salesiano da Imaculada Conceição, primary through secondary school

Saint Joseph Seminary of the University of Saint Joseph is in São Lourenço.

Macao Public Library operates two branches in the parish: the Sir Robert Ho Tung Library and the S. Lourenço Library (Biblioteca de S. Lourenço; 下環圖書館). The latter occupies  of space on the third floor of the Municipal Market Complex of St. Lourenço (下環街市). The S. Lourenço branch opened in December 2009 and was a part of the renovation of the market.

See also
Macau Government Headquarters (Sede do Governo da RAEM)

References

External links

Freguesias da RAEM

Freguesias of Macau
Macau Peninsula